The Office of Emergency Planning, Preparedness and Operations (OEPPO) provides emergency planning and operational support to the United States House of Representatives. The Office was established by legislation in 2002, in the aftermath of the September 11 attacks to ensure continuity of government.

The office is responsible for House mitigation and preparedness operations, crisis management
and response, and resource services and recovery operations. The director of OEPPO
is jointly appointed by the Speaker and Minority Leader. The Speaker, in consultation with the minority leader, provides the policy direction and oversight of the office and may request a detail of personnel from any federal agency on a reimbursable basis. A director carries out the daily operations of the office under the supervision of the House of Representatives Continuity of Operations Board. Due to the sensitive nature of its mission, some of the agency's operational details are not publicly available.

The Office has conducted training on the use of personal protective equipment and emergency evacuation procedures and developed training plans to the House Staff on evacuation procedures for employees and visitors with disabilities. Following a TOPOFF 3 exercise in 2005, its provisions for evacuating persons with disabilities were questioned during a Congressional hearing.

Budget

The Office's budget for salaries and expenses was $3,049,000 during fiscal year 2008.

Notes

References

Emergency Planning, Preparedness, and Operations
Emergency management in the United States
Disaster preparedness in the United States
Continuity of government in the United States
Government agencies established in 2002
2002 establishments in the United States